John McDonald (born 28 May 1965) is a Canadian archer. He competed in the men's individual and team events at the 1988 Summer Olympics.

References

External links
 

1965 births
Living people
Canadian male archers
Olympic archers of Canada
Archers at the 1988 Summer Olympics
Sportspeople from Halifax, Nova Scotia
Pan American Games medalists in archery
Pan American Games bronze medalists for Canada
Archers at the 1987 Pan American Games
Medalists at the 1987 Pan American Games
20th-century Canadian people